The 1904 Massachusetts Aggies football team represented Massachusetts Agricultural College in the 1904 college football season. The team was coached by Matthew W. Bullock and played its home games at Alumni Field in Amherst, Massachusetts. The 1904 season was Bullock's first as head coach of the Aggies. He would leave the team following the season, but return to coach again in 1907. Massachusetts finished the season with a record of 5–2–1.

Schedule

References

Massachusetts
UMass Minutemen football seasons
Massachusetts Aggies football